Thiago Carpini Barbosa (born 16 July 1984), is a Brazilian professional football manager and former player who played as a defensive midfielder. He is the current manager of Água Santa.

References

External links

 placar

1984 births
People from Valinhos
Living people
Association football midfielders
Brazilian footballers
Brazilian football managers
Campeonato Brasileiro Série A players
Campeonato Brasileiro Série B players
Campeonato Brasileiro Série C players
Campeonato Brasileiro Série D players
Campeonato Brasileiro Série B managers
Estrela do Norte Futebol Clube players
Associação Atlética Ponte Preta players
Clube Atlético Mineiro players
América Futebol Clube (RN) players
Esporte Clube Bahia players
Clube Recreativo e Atlético Catalano players
São José Esporte Clube players
Atlético Monte Azul players
Esporte Clube Novo Hamburgo players
Guarani Esporte Clube (MG) players
Guarani FC players
Clube Atlético Penapolense players
Associação Atlética Caldense players
Guarani FC managers
Oeste Futebol Clube managers
Esporte Clube Santo André managers
Associação Ferroviária de Esportes managers
Footballers from São Paulo (state)
Associação Atlética Internacional (Limeira) managers
Esporte Clube Água Santa managers